Roxi Drive is a British singer-songwriter and actress. In 2017, she began writing and recording 1980s-influenced synth-pop, synth-rock and synthwave songs, having always had a passion for 1980s music. Her first song, "Run All Night (Chase This Dream)", was released in June 2017 as a collaboration with producer Sellorekt/LA Dreams. Later that year, she released her first extended play, Girl on the TV. She worked with several producers for her first studio album, Strangers of the Night, which was released in October 2018. She released several more singles, including "Dangerous" with Juno Dreams and "Polybius (Arcade Killer)", and her second album, Electric Heart, was released in October 2020. Her music has been received positively, with praise towards her songwriting and production.

Career 
As a child, Roxi Drive regularly performed in school choirs, plays, and theatre groups. She often watched Top of the Pops and was "entranced" by artists like Tiffany, Madonna, and the Pet Shop Boys. When she was 10, she asked her teacher if she could perform "Eternal Flame" by the Bangles in front of the class. Her original background is acting, though she felt a lack of enthusiasm for the roles for which she auditioned, preferring writing and recording music. She was involved in musical theatre, having always enjoyed singing. She was part of a 1940s-style harmony group, The Morellas, which toured around the United Kingdom. As a fan of 1980s music, she finds her synthwave music more fulfilling to create. Some of her influences include Kim Wilde, Tuesday Knight, Cyndi Lauper, and Tears for Fears. She specifically cited the colour and fashion as some of the highlights of the 1980s.

Sellorekt/LA Dreams reworked his song "Run All Night" with vocals by Roxi Drive; they originally used full verse–chorus form and more lyrics, but cut it down with a main chorus. It was released as "Run All Night (Chase This Dream) in 2017. Roxi Drive released an extended play (EP), Girl on the TV in 2017. Roxi Drive worked with several producers for her first full album, Strangers of the Night, including TAKTA, with whom she had worked on her EP; they both wanted to work on an Italo disco song, which led to "Walking Out of Love". Roxi Drive wanted the album to tell a story, akin to a film, with different emotions and genres; she "wanted it to be fun and nostalgic" and display the "roller coaster of emotions" of humans. The album was received positively; Michael Marotta of Vanyaland praised the writing and timing of the tracks, and Vehlinggos Andrew B. White lauded the production and arrangement.

The song "Night Waves" was recorded to promote the horror novel of the same name by David Irons. "Dangerous", released as a single in May 2019, was produced by Juno Dreams; the track was almost complete when Roxi Drive joined it, and she provided lyrics and vocals. Her lyrics were inspired by Fright Night (1985), one of her favourite horror films. She later considered "Dangerous" to be her favourite of her songs. "Breathe You", released as a single in January 2020, was inspired by the film Starman (1984); the song is based around an extra-terrestrial being who struggles to return home as he has fallen in love. "Breathe You" was named among the best synth songs of March 2020 by Magnetic Magazines Chris Rohn.

Roxi Drive worked with several producers for her second album, Electric Heart. She wanted to achieve an authentic style with the songs, exploring more pop rock tracks with electric guitars. Some of her favourite songs from the album include: "All My Dreams", as she felt that her voice synergised well with Kidburn, who wrote the track; "Breakdown" and "Video Fantasy", which she described as "real food stomping feel good tunes"; and "Electricity", as it is enjoyable to perform on stage. For the cover of Electric Heart, Roxi Drive was inspired by covers from the 1980s, including Pat Benatar and Laura Brannigan. Her friend and band member Glen Jevon took the photographs at her house in an afternoon. The album was received positively; Forever Synth praised "the passion and immense work that went into this alluring album", and  Raymond Garcia of Synth Zone scored the album 8/10, calling Roxi Drive "soulfully beautiful inside and out".

In 2020, Roxi Drive wrote the song "Polybius (Arcade Killer)", which was her first collaboration with Glen Jevon as producer, to promote Irons's horror novel Polybius. She released a music video for the song "Video Fantasy" in 2020, for which she enlisted the help of a community of 1980s music fans on Instagram; due to the COVID-19 pandemic, they filmed themselves dancing in their homes dressed in 1980s-inspired outfits and hairstyles. In July 2020, Roxi Drive was featured on the compilation album Hot Summer Synth Vol. 1, by Future 80's Records. She released a single, "1985", in October 2020. The song is a collaboration with Sellorekt/LA Dreams and saxophonist Josh Wakeham. In the future, Roxi Drive intends to release a VHS tape consisting of her music videos, with interviews in between.

In Feb 2022, Roxi Drive and Glen Jevon collaborated once again on 'Make Me Scream', a fully in-house produced single with Roxi Drive as author and topliner, and Glen Jevon composing and producing, as well as shooting and editing the accompanying music video. Roxi Drive and Glen Jevon are currently writing and recording their first full album together.

Discography

Albums and EPs

Singles

As featured artist

References 

Living people
British women singer-songwriters
British synth-pop musicians
English songwriters
Singers from London
Synth-pop singers
Year of birth missing (living people)